Bilakhiya Stadium or G. M. Bilakhia Cricket stadium is a cricket ground in Vapi, India.  The first recorded match on the ground was in 2002, when it was the venue for a game in the Cooch Behar Trophy. The ground has also hosted a Women's Test match and a Women's ODI.

References

Cricket grounds in Gujarat
Valsad district
Year of establishment missing